Uzundara or ouzoundara is a lyrical Armenian and Azerbaijani dance traditionally performed by women. Today, the dance is famous throughout the Caucasus region; in particular Armenia, Azerbaijan and Georgia.

Etymology and origin 
The place of origin is Nagorno-Karabakh. The origination of the dance is claimed by both Armenians and Azerbaijanis alike due to the fact that both nations lived in Karabakh, where the Uzundere valley is located. According to Azerbaijani scholars, the dance originates in a Uzundara valley between Aghdam and Baş Qərvənd in the region of Karabakh. According to another explanation, the dance was brought to the region by Armenians from Erzurum, who fled from the Ottoman Empire in 1828 during the Russian-Turkish war.

Translated from Azerbaijani, the word Uzundara means "long gorge" or "long valley". The word Uzundara itself comes from the word "Uzun", which is of Old Turkic origin and means "long", and the word "Dara", which is of Persian origin and means "gorge".  Armenian ethnographer Srbuhi Lisitsian notes that "dara", in addition to a "gorge", can also mean a "pit".

Performing 
The dance is performed easily, smoothly. Circular strokes and small lateral steps are coordinated with gentle movements. It has a 3-part structure, with more active movement in the outer parts and smooth in the middle. A typical method of melodic development is the variation of two-, three- and four-bar motives.

According to Tamara Stepanovna Tkachenko, three elements alternate in Uzundara in the following order: moves in a circle, "syzme" (small, "floating" steps) and small movements forward or from side to side such as "khyrdalyk". She described those elements as "main elements of Azerbaijani female dance", while pointing out that "syzme" is an "integral part of Armenian dance". Tkachenko also noted that in Armenia, the lyrical dance of the bride was performed after the solemn dances of the matchmaker, parents, and groom, to the melodies of "Uzundara", "Nunufar" or "Rangi".

References

External links
 Azerbaijanis performing Uzundara
 Armenians performing Uzundara

Azerbaijani music
Azerbaijani dances
Armenian music
Armenian dances
Turkic words and phrases